Mongolia competed at the 2016 Winter Youth Olympics in Lillehammer, Norway from 12 to 21 February 2016.

Medalists in mixed NOCs events

Cross-country skiing

Boys

Speed skating

Girls

Mixed team sprint

See also
Mongolia at the 2016 Summer Olympics

References

2016 in Mongolian sport
Nations at the 2016 Winter Youth Olympics
Mongolia at the Youth Olympics